Wong Keng Tsai is a village in Sai Kung District, Hong Kong.

Administration
Wong Keng Tsai is a recognized village under the New Territories Small House Policy.

References

External links
 Delineation of area of existing village Wong Keng Tsai (Sai Kung) for election of resident representative (2019 to 2022)

Villages in Sai Kung District, Hong Kong
Sai Kung District